Evan Thomas, Radcliffe and Company was one of the more prosperous and better-known of Cardiff-based shipowning companies, established in 1882 by a Ceredigion sea captain, Evan Thomas, and a Merthyr Tydfil businessman, Henry Radcliffe. Until 1939 one of the main trades of the company was to carry Welsh steam coal, which reached its peak in the years immediately before World War I. The company was ceased trading in the 1980s.

History

Origins
In 1881, Evan Thomas, a Master Mariner from Aberporth in Ceredigion who had served with Jones Bros. of Newport an JH Anning of Cardiff, went into partnership with Henry Radcliffe, a Merthyr Tydfil businessman and they bought their first ship together. The combination of master mariner and businessman as partners was not uncommon at this time in Cardiff.

It was not hard for the partners to raise money to buy their first ship, with most of the capital being raised in Wales. The partners risked very little of their own money, instead buying the ship on mortgage. The capital being raised as shares in a single ship company.

Evan Thomas

Captain Evan Thomas was a master mariner from the West Wales village of Aberporth in Ceredigion. His family lived at Dolwen, a substantial house overlooking the beach.  He was the son of Hezekiah Thomas (1805–1869) who owned a 47-ton ketch, Pheasant, and part-owner of a number of other vessels. From Aberporth coal and limestone was imported by coastal vessels from South Pembrokeshire and Cardigan Bay. Evan Thomas's brother, Thomas Thomas (1836–1911) was a part-time sailor, part-time farmer, and became secretary of the Aberporth Mutual Ship Insurance Society.

Capt. Evan Thomas obtained his master's certificate and after eight years as Master in Steam in the tramps of the Baltic, Mediterranean, Black Sea, and United States of America proposed the setting up of a new ship-owning company in Cardiff, the booming coal metropolis.

Evan Thomas commanded Gwenllian Thomas, the first ship bought by Evan Thomas, Radcliffe.  By 1884 Evan Thomas gave up the sea, and on his death at the age of 59 on 14 November 1891 the company he had established less than ten years previously owned 15 tramp steamships.

Evan Thomas had a son and four daughters.

Henry Radcliffe

Henry Radcliffe (1857–1921) was a businessman from Merthyr Tydfil, an important Welsh industrial town. On the death of Evan Thomas in 1891, Henry Radcliffe took into partnership his younger brother Daniel. Henry Radcliffe died in 1921 at the age of 66 at his home in Druidstone, St Mellons. He left a son, Wyndham Ivor Radcliffe and two daughters, Clarissa Gwendoline Gwynne Maitland and Sarah Ethel Radcliffe.

He was an extensive owned of land in the Vale of Glamorgan and held shares in a large number of companies in South Wales including the Taff Vale Railway, Barry Railway Co., Vale of Glamorgan Railway Co., Tempus Shipping Co., Cardiff Port Iron & Coal Storage Co., North's Navigation Collieries Ltd., Great Western Colliery Co. Ltd., P. & A. Campbell Ltd., Cambrian Railways, Alexandra Docks Newport and Guest Keen & Nettlefolds.

On the death of Henry Radcliffe, chairmanship of the company passed on to his younger brother Daniel.

Daniel Radcliffe

Daniel Radcliffe of Tal-y-werydd, Penylan, Cardiff, joined the company at the age of 24 in 1892 having previously worked for Cardiff shipowners JH Anning and the Turnbull Brothers. On joining the company he promoted rapid growth with the result that in 1900 the business owned a total of 24 ships.

Daniel Radcliffe died on 29 March 1933.

Early years

As Evan Thomas, Radcliffe's business succeeded, more and more ships were added to the fleet. As many as 31 single-ship companies were registered in the company's name. Gwenllian Thomas went to sea under the command of Evan Thomas, his partner taking charge of the office at 4 Dock Chambers and all the chartering arrangements. In 1882, a second ship, Iolo Morganwg (1,292 tons) was bought from Palmers Shipbuilding and Iron Company of Jarrow who has already built Gwenllian Thomas. In 1883 came Kate Thomas (1,588 tons) and Anne Thomas (1,419 tons) followed by Wynnstay (1,542 tons) in 1884. Around this time Evan Thomas gave up the sea.

The Black Sea trade
All the Evan Thomas, Radcliffe ships were tramp steamers, sailing not along fixed routes but to whatever port in the world the charterers wished. Nevertheless, from 1882 when the company was established until about 1914 there was a pattern of trading with the ships taking out cargoes of coal from the Tyne ports and South Wales to west European or Mediterranean ports, then proceeding in ballast to the Black Sea, to such ports as Odessa, Taranrog and Novorossisk, returning to British, but more likely a continental port, with grain. This became so much the normal pattern of trading that the annual reports of the company constantly refer to the Black Sea traffic.

This pattern of trading was repeated for almost all the Evan Thomas, Radcliffe ships with little variation until 1912–13 when there was a decline in the trade. Gradually the Black Sea trade declined and Evan Thomas, Radcliffe, in common with other Cardiff shipowners, had to look elsewhere for their trade. The Black Sea trade in its heyday was a very lucrative business and the carriage of coal from South Wales outwards and grain from southern Russia inwards really provided the basis of success for Evan Thomas, Radcliffe. Ships rarely sailed in ballast except for short voyages from the points of discharge of coal to the Black Sea and from continental ports to Cardiff or Barry.

The Black Sea trade did continue until the early years of the First World War, but some of the ships were making more frequent appearances in America and south east Asia. For example, Washington, from its construction in 1907 until December 1912, was concerned exclusively with the carriage of coal from South Wales to the Mediterranean and the carriage of grain from the Black Sea ports to Hamburg, Rotterdam and Marseille. In December 1912 she sailed from Barry with a cargo of coal from Rio de Janeiro. She then returned from Bahía Blanca to London with grain and left on another voyage from Barry to Rio de Janeiro returning to Rotterdam with general cargo from New Orleans. She then returned to the Black Sea trade for another five voyages before sailing in ballast after unloading coal at Taranto for Pondicherry, returning with a cargo of ground nuts for Marseille. She then sailed across the Atlantic to New Orleans returning to Marseille in February 1914 with a cargo of wheat.

Llangorse, another example, was used exclusively for the normal Black Sea coal and grain trade from 1907 to 1912; she then crossed the Atlantic to Baltimore returning to Hamburg with grain. After six more voyages to the Black Sea the ship visited Galveston, La Plata, Buenos Aires, Philadelphia, Rosario, San Nicholas and Aguilas being concerned with the transport of grain and iron ore, to Naples, Barcelona, Glasgow, Genoa and Avonmouth. Gradually, the trans-Atlantic trade was becoming more and more important in the activities of Cardiff shipowners.

First World War
At the outbreak of the First World War in 1914, Evan Thomas, Radcliffe was the largest of the Cardiff shipowners owning a fleet of 28 ships. In the war the company lost 20 ships.

Post-war depression
Although substantial sums of money were received in compensation for the ships lost in the war, Evan Thomas, Radcliffe, unlike some other Cardiff shipowning companies, did not immediately enter the post-war market for very expensive ships. In 1919, the company owned only nine ships, with a total gross tonnage of 41,254. The company bought only one ship, Ethel Radcliffe, in 1920 as a replacement for the 20 ships lost in the war. As a result the company was well able to weather the storm of the slump in the 1920s.

The one new ship, Ethel Radcliffe, of 5,673 gross tons was built for the company by Craig Taylor & Co. of Stockton-on-Tees at a very inflated price of £274,019. She sailed on her maiden voyage under the command of Captain M Mathias of Cardigan with a cargo of coal for Port Said. She then sailed in ballast to Mauritius returning to London with a cargo of sugar, then to Norfolk, Virginia in ballast to return to Immingham with a cargo of coal.

In 1919 and 1920 many of Evan Thomas, Radcliffe's ships were time chartered to other companies, but 1921 saw the slump really biting with the result that many of the company's ships were laid up for extended periods because no cargoes were available for them. Despite this, some of the Evan Thomas, Radcliffe ships were fully occupied in the first few years of the 1920s, although substantial losses were made on many of the voyages. Despite the fact that some of the ships were in constant employ in the early twenties, the golden era was obviously over and the annual reports of the various single ship companies that made up Evan Thomas, Radcliffe & Company reflect the general gloom and depression that seemed to have prevailed among the Cardiff shipowners in the early twenties.

In anticipation of those better times, Evan Thomas, Radcliffe began to invest money in new ships in 1925. The new ships were considerably cheaper than Ethel Radcliffe of 1920, built when the prices of new and old ships were very inflated. Nevertheless, in the 1920s substantial losses were made in the trading of all the ships.

The Great Depression that started in 1929 caused a worldwide slump in merchant shipping. After a few years trade began to recover, and the company invested in two new ships from Bartram & Sons of Sunderland: the sister ships  launched in 1936 and Llandaff launched in 1937. Unusually for steamships built in the 1930s Llanashe and Llandaff each had a compound engine. Triple-expansion engines had largely superseded compound engines in the 1860s. But in Llanashe and Llandaff the compound engine was combined with a exhaust steam turbine to achieve a third stage of steam expansion and hence economy in bunkering.

Second World War
Evan Thomas, Radcliffe lost 11 ships in the Second World War.

28 June 1940 – Llanarth – torpedoed off Lands End  on voyage from Melbourne with flour.
11 August 1940 – Llanfair – torpedoed on a voyage from Mackay and Bowen (Queensland) to UK with sugar .
23 August 1940 – Llanishen – sunk by air attack southeast of Wick  on voyage from Three Rivers (Quebec) to Leith with maize.
26 February 1941 – Llanwern – bombed by aircraft off southwest coast of Ireland.  on voyage from Sorel (Quebec) with grain and timber for Avonmouth.
17 April 1941 – Ethel Radcliffe – torpedoed by an E-boat off the East Anglian coast on a voyage from Saint John, New Brunswick to Great Yarmouth with maize. Beached on Yarmouth sands, but bombed and made total loss on 14 May 1941.
12 May 1942 – Llanover – torpedoed in North Atlantic  on voyage from New York and Halifax, Nova Scotia for London with wheat, apples and tanks.
2 November 1942 – Llandilo – torpedoed south of Saint Helena on voyage from New York. .
17 February 1943 – Llanashe – torpedoed off Port Elizabeth  on voyage from New York.
18 March 1943 – Clarissa Radcliffe – torpedoed with loss of all hands,  on voyage from Pepel with iron ore.
30 March 1944 – Vera Radcliffe – handed over to the Ministry of War Transport (MoWT) for use as a blockship on Normandy beaches.

This left the company with a greatly depleted fleet, for only five ships survived the war. They were Llanberis, Llangollen, Peterston, Flimston and Llandaff. UK ships were lost much faster than they could be replaced and the Government decided that it would be impossible to back a new shipbuilding programme entirely in this country which was so vulnerable to enemy attack. Therefore a British Merchant Shipbuilding Mission left for the USA in September 1940 and the terms of its brief was to endeavour to obtain at the earliest possible moment the delivery of merchant tonnage...of vessels of the tramp type of about 10,000 tons deadweight.

Canadian shipyards built 198 Fort ships and US shipyards supplied Ocean and Liberty ships. Evan Thomas, Radcliffe obtained six of these ships together with Samskern, a ship lent to the MoWT under the Lease-Lend system at a charter rate of a dollar a year.

With the great depletion in the fleet as a result of war, the company was forced to look elsewhere for extra tonnage. It bought US and Canadian standard ships of the Fort type.

Latter years
The period after 1945 was a period of reconstruction and rebuilding, but Evan Thomas, Radcliffe, in common with all other South Wales shipowners, never repeated the prosperity of the beriod before the First World War. Cardiff saw a gradual decline in the fortunes of its docks as coal exports diminished. Cardiff was, above all, a coal exporting port and it was on this that its fortunes had been built. Many of the Cardiff tramp steamers were concerned in the coal trade and the ships owned by Evan Thomas, Radcliffe were mainly designed for transporting coal.

The company had to look elsewhere for its freight and with the change of ownership to the Evans and Reid group, as a fully integrated company within the group after some years in partnership with Evans and Reid, the Radcliffe fleet became mainly an oil tanker fleet.

In 1946 the company had only five ships of its own: Llanberis (built 1928); Llangollen (built 1928); Peterston (built 1925); Flimston (built 1925) and Llandaff (built 1937). It was operating another eight standard ships on behalf of the Ministry of Transport or on charter.

The pattern of trading had changed considerably. The tankers mainly carried oil from the Persian Gulf, Sumatra and elsewhere to European ports, but the other steamers – Llanover and Llanwern were concerned with worldwide tramping, rarely visiting their home port of Cardiff.

In 1950 and 1951 too, the pre-war ships Llandaff and Llangollen were sold which left the company with only one ship, the tanker Llanishen of 1945 with a new motor ship, Llantrisant, a freighter of 6,140 tons being built by Bartram's. She was launched on 27 March 1952 and delivered to her owners on 5 September 1952. She was in the fleet for five years as a worldwide tramp. In 1957 she was sold to a Vancouver company as Lake Burnaby.

In the early 1950s the company had few ships, so a number were chartered. After the delivery of Llantrisant in 1952, another new ship, the oil tanker Llandaff was built by Lithgows of Port Glasgow. She remain in the fleet until 1960, for much of the time being chartered to Anglo-Saxon Petroleum. but on 16 February 1960 she was sold to the Island Shipping Company of Bermuda.

In 1957 Bartram's delivered a new motor ship, the freighter Llantrisant. The next year Swan Hunter at Wallsend delivered the oil tanker Llanishen. In 1960 the tanker Hamilton, built at Tamise, Belgium, was delivered on time charter and the Furness Shipbuilding Company of Haverton Hill delivered the tanker Llangorse. In October 1962 Bartrams delivered the freighter Llanwern.

In 1964–5 therefore, the Evan Thomas, Radcliffe fleet comprised five ships. By 1970 Llanwern and Llantrisant had been sold and in 1971 SA Boelwerf of Tamise, Belgium delivered Stolt Llandaff, the last ship to be built for the company. She was a specialised oil and chemical tanker and remained as an Evan Thomas, Radcliffe ship on charter to the company from the Stolt Corporation of Monrovia until December 1981. With the sale of Hamilton, Llangorse and Llanishen, Stolt Llandaff remained the sole ship in the fleet until 1980 when two small coastal ships, Radcliffe Trader and Radcliffe Venturer, were bought.

Fleet

Notable captains
 Capt. J. Alexander of Cardiff
 Capt. W. R. Burgess of Cardiff
 Capt. G. Clark of Plymouth
 Capt. D. J. Davies of Aberarth
 Capt. J. Davies of Aberporth
 Capt. J. A. Davies of Cardigan
 Capt. E. H. Dolton of Brixham
 Capt. J. James of Aberporth
 Capt. J. R. Jenkins of Aberporth
 Capt. E. Jones of Llanarth
 Capt. J. Jones of Aberarth
 Capt. John Jones of Rhoshirwaun
 Capt. J. W. Jones of St Dogmaels
 Capt. T. Jones of Blaenporth
 Capt. M. Mathias of Cardigan
 Capt. S. H. Mathias of Newport, Pembrokeshire
 Capt. B. T. Morris – Marine Superintendent for Evan Thomas Radcliffe
 Capt. J. E. Owen of Swansea
 Capt. T. Owens of Llangrannog
 Capt. R. Rees of St Dogmaels
 Capt. R. Roberts of Holyhead
 Capt. D. Smith of Lewis
 Capt. J. Thomas of Cardiff
 Capt. J. E. Thomas of Newcastle Emlyn
 Capt. W. Thomas of Llaniestyn
 Capt. D. Williams of Machynlleth
 Capt. John Williams of Cardiff
 Capt. T. Wood of Cardiff

The Evan Thomas Radcliffe brand was sold to the Evan Reid Group of Cardiff.

References

Bibliography
 Jenkins, David, Cardiff tramps, Cardi crews, Journal of the Cardiganshire Antiquarian Society, Vol. 10, nos. 1–4 – 1984–1987, 
 Jenkins, J. Geraint, Evan Thomas Radcliffe : a Cardiff Shipowning Company, National Museum of Wales, Cardiff, 1982, 

Defunct shipping companies of the United Kingdom
Shipping companies of Wales
Companies based in Cardiff